India is scheduled to compete at the 2024 Summer Olympics in Paris from 26 July to 11 August 2024. Indian athletes have appeared in every edition of the Summer Olympic Games since 1920, although they made the team's official debut in Paris 1900.

Competitors
The following is the list of number of competitors in the Games.

Athletics

Indian track and field athletes achieved the entry standards for Paris 2024, either by passing the direct qualifying mark (or time for track and road races) or by world ranking, in the following events (a maximum of 3 athletes each):

Track and road events

Shooting

Indian shooters achieved quota places for the following events based on their results at the 2022 and 2023 ISSF World Championships, 2023 and 2024 Asian Championships, and 2024 ISSF World Olympic Qualification Tournament, if they obtained a minimum qualifying score (MQS) from 14 August 2022 to 9 June 2024. The Indian shooting squad will be named based on the shooters' average scores from three of the four selection trials approved by the National Rifle Association of India (NRAI) at the start of the 2024 season.

See also 
 India at the 2024 Summer Paralympics

References

Nations at the 2024 Summer Olympics
2024
2024 in Indian sport